Xining Subdistrict  is a subdistrict situated in Xuanwei, Yunnan, China. , it administers the following five residential neighborhoods and five villages:
Neighborhoods
Xiyuan
Jinxi
Laobu
Huajiao
Yuantun

Villages
Majie Village
Jingwai Village
Liezu Village
Qiapo Village
Chishui Village

See also
List of township-level divisions of Yunnan

References

Township-level divisions of Qujing
Xuanwei